Gmina Zalesie is a rural gmina (administrative district) in Biała Podlaska County, Lublin Voivodeship, in eastern Poland.

Villages
Gmina Zalesie contains the villages and settlements of Berezówka, Dereczanka, Dobryń Duży, Dobryń Mały, Dobryń-Kolonia, Horbów, Horbów-Kolonia, Kijowiec, Kijowiec-Kolonia, Kłoda Duża, Kłoda Mała, Koczukówka, Lachówka Duża, Lachówka Mała, Malowa Góra, Nowosiółki, Wólka Dobryńska and Zalesie.

Neighbouring gminas
Gmina Zalesie is bordered by the gminas of Biała Podlaska, Piszczac, Rokitno and Terespol.

References

External links
Polish official population figures 2006

Gminas in Lublin Voivodeship
Biała Podlaska County